A plain-language radio check is the means of requesting and giving a signal strength and readability report for radiotelephony (voice) communications, and is the direct equivalent to the QSA and QRK code used to give the same report in radiotelegraph (Morse code) communications. SINPEMFO code is the voice signal reporting format developed by the ITU in 1959, but sees little use outside of shortwave listeners.

Allied Communications Procedure 125(F), Communication Instructions Radiotelephone Procedure, published by the Combined Communication Electronics Board, defines radiotelephone procedures, and contains the original definitions for many common radio communications procedures, including Procedure Words, radio net operations, etc. Section 611 of ACP 125(F) details how to conduct radio checks using plain language.

Radio check procedure
The prowords listed below are for use when initiating and answering queries concerning signal strength and readability.

Signal strength prowords

Readability prowords

Examples of usage
One of these reports, "LOUD AND CLEAR", is commonly used in television shows, movies, literature, and by radio operators, commonly without knowing the source or the rest of the standard reports (hence the much-reduced frequency with which the other combinations are used). For example:

LOUD AND CLEAR means Excellent copy with no noise
LOUD BUT DISTORTED means the signal strength is very strong but the audio is distorted.
GOOD AND READABLE means Good copy with slight noise
FAIR BUT READABLE means Fair copy, occasional fills are needed
WEAK BUT READABLE means Weak copy, frequent fills are needed
WEAK WITH INTERFERENCE means the signal strength is weak and there is also interference from another signal.
WEAK AND UNREADABLE means Unable to copy, a relay is required

The omission of comment on signal strength and readability, by responding only with the proword ROGER, is understood to mean that reception is LOUD AND CLEAR. If reception is other than loud and clear, it must be described with the appropriate prowords.

Reports such as "five by five", "four by four", etc., will not be used to indicate strength and quality of reception.

References

See also
QSA and QRK code (for Morse code only)
R-S-T system (for Amateur radio only)
SINPO code
Signal strength and readability report
Circuit Merit (for wired and wireless telephone circuits only, not radiotelephony)
Procedure Words
Allied Communication Procedures

Operating signals